Hiempsal, was the name of the two kings of Numidia
Hiempsal I, the son of Micipsa, was assassinated by Jugurtha.
Hiempsal II, the son of Gauda, the half-brother of Jugurtha.